The Nikon Coolpix L100 is a semi-compact digital camera produced by Nikon Corporation and is part of the Nikon Coolpix series. It belongs to the "Life" series of Nikon digital cameras, which are intended for beginner and amateur users, announced in 2009.

Description
The Nikon Coolpix L100 provides good results without the operator needing to acquire professional-level skills. The L100 is a good choice for beginners and amateurs. With an optical zoom of 15x, it is an improvement over other compact digital cameras that generally have a maximum optical zoom of 5x. The Nikon Coolpix L100 competes against the Sony DSC-H20 and Canon Sx120, which have similar configurations and prices.

Features
 Angular glass lens Nikkor reaching an optical zoom up to 15x (28–420 mm)
 Shutter 1 / 1000 – 2 sec
 Sensor 10 megapixels (500 x 760 mm)
 Setting ISO 80–3200
 Viewfinder: 3-inch LCD
 Power standard for AA batteries: alkaline or lithium batteries (recommended by the manufacturer); support for NiMH batteries can be added by upgrading the firmware
 JPEG photo

Compatibility with rechargeable batteries
Due to a bug in the camera's firmware, rechargeable batteries cannot keep up with the power demands of the camera. An upgrade of the firmware is available from the company's website.

References

External links
 Nikon website
 Review of Coolpix L100 in Portuguese

Nikon Coolpix cameras